Pleuropogon refractus is a species of grass known by the common name nodding semaphoregrass. It is native to the west coast of North America from British Columbia to northern California, where it grows in moist meadows, marshy areas, and shady forests.

Description
Pleuropogon refractus is a perennial bunchgrass growing to a maximum height around 1.6 meters. The inflorescence bears widely spaced cylindrical spikelets which hang sideways off the stem, resembling semaphore signals. Each spikelet may be up to 2.5 centimeters long and may contain up to 14 flowers. As the spikelets develop the stem may bend over or nod, so that the spikelets point downward.

External links
Jepson Manual Treatment: Pleuropogon refractus
USDA Plants Profile: Pleuropogon refractus
Washington Burke Museum
Pleuropogon refractus Photo gallery

Pooideae
Bunchgrasses of North America
Native grasses of California
Grasses of the United States
Grasses of Canada
Flora of Washington (state)
Flora of Oregon
Flora without expected TNC conservation status